AHQ often stands for "Air Headquarters" and may refer to

 Air H.Q. Air Defences Eastern Mediterranean
 Air Headquarters East Africa
 Air Headquarters (Pakistan Air Force)
 AHQ Iraq
 AHQ Levant
 AHQ Malta
 Desert Air Force
 ahq e-Sports Club, an esports team based in Taiwan
 Ah Q, the fictional protagonist of the novella The True Story of Ah Q